Thomas Jefferson Paterson, sometimes misspelled Patterson, (April 10, 1805 – February 15, 1885), was a U.S. Representative from New York.

Paterson was born in Lisle, New York and attended public schools.

Paterson was elected as a Whig to the Twenty-eighth Congress (March 4, 1843 – March 3, 1845).
He was engaged as a land agent in Rochester, New York.

State Senator John E. Paterson (born 1800) was his brother; Congressman John Paterson (1744–1808) and State Senator Caleb Hyde were his grandfathers.

External links

1805 births
1885 deaths
People from Lisle, New York
Year of birth unknown
Year of death unknown
Whig Party members of the United States House of Representatives from New York (state)
19th-century American politicians